Issam Barhoumi (born October 1, 1978, in Sidi Bouzid) is a Tunisian heavyweight Sanshou kickboxer.

Biography 
At the 10th International Wushu Federation Congress following the 2009 World Wushu Championships in Toronto, he served on the athletes' committee.

Issam won three world championships in the town of Marina Di Carrara, Italy from November 1 to 4, 2012: MMA world champion, K-1 world champion, light kickboxing world champion and champion of the world of Kung-fu, exploits still not publicized.

Issam won two world championships in Bussero, Italy on April 3, 2016, in K-1 and light contact disciplines. With these two medals, Issam Barhoumi currently holds world championship records 12 times in 7 disciplines. He stated afterwards that he was proud to have represented Tunisia as it should be, and to have honored the national flag.

Mixed martial arts record

|-
|Loss
|align=center|0–1
|Samir Medjahdi
|(TKO)
|Hard Fighting Championship
|
|align=center|1
|align=center|2:31
|Basel, Switzerland
|

Record

Cinema

films 
 2005 : L'esclave du passé pour un projet fin d'etude
 2007 : cours métrage Fibali by Semi Jlassi
 2010 : cours metrage Il était une fois à l'aube by Mohamed Ali Nahdi.                               
 2023 : long metrage sabe9 el Khir by kais chekir

Television

Series 
 2017 : Bolice by Majdi Smiri
 2018 : 7 Sbeya by Kalfallah Khalsi
 2018 : Denya okhra by Mamdouh Ben Abdelghaffar
 2018 : Harba by Kais Chekir

Emissions 
 2015 : Emissions Social 15/25

References 

Tunisian male kickboxers
Tunisian male mixed martial artists
Mixed martial artists utilizing sanshou
Mixed martial artists utilizing Shuai Jiao
Mixed martial artists utilizing savate
Mixed martial artists utilizing taekwondo
Mixed martial artists utilizing jujutsu
Mixed martial artists utilizing Yoseikan budō
Tunisian sanshou practitioners
Tunisian savateurs
Tunisian jujutsuka
Tunisian male taekwondo practitioners
Living people
1978 births